Guillermo Padilla (22 June 1912 – 20 February 1986) was a Colombian sports shooter. He competed in the 50 metre rifle, three positions event at the 1956 Summer Olympics. Padilla was also the President of the Colombian Olympic Committee from 1954 to 1957.

References

External links
 

1912 births
1986 deaths
Colombian male sport shooters
Olympic shooters of Colombia
Shooters at the 1956 Summer Olympics
Place of birth missing